The canton of Barrême is a former administrative division in southeastern France. It was disbanded following the French canton reorganisation which came into effect in March 2015. It consisted of 8 communes, which joined the canton of Riez in 2015. It had 1,270 inhabitants (2012).

The canton comprised the following communes:

Barrême
Blieux
Chaudon-Norante
Clumanc
Saint-Jacques
Saint-Lions
Senez
Tartonne

Demographics

See also
Cantons of the Alpes-de-Haute-Provence department

References

Former cantons of Alpes-de-Haute-Provence
2015 disestablishments in France
States and territories disestablished in 2015